Clay Township is an inactive township in Greene County, in the U.S. state of Missouri.

Clay Township was named after Henry Clay.

References

Townships in Missouri
Townships in Greene County, Missouri